Haptocorrin also known as transcobalamin-1 (TC-1) or cobalophilin is a transcobalamin protein that in humans is encoded by the  gene. The essential function of haptocorrin is protection of the acid-sensitive vitamin B12 while it moves through the stomach.

Function 

Haptocorrin (HC), also commonly known as the R-protein, or the R-factor, or previously referred to as transcobalamin I, is a unique glycoprotein produced by the salivary glands of the oral cavity, in response to ingestion of food. This protein binds strongly to vitamin B12 in what is an intricate and necessary mechanism to protect this vitamin from the acidic environment of the stomach. Vitamin B12 is an essential water-soluble vitamin, the deficiency of which creates anemia (macrocytic anemia), decreased bone marrow cell production (anemia, pancytopenia), neurological problems, as well as metabolic issues (methylmalonyl-CoA acidosis).

Vitamin B12 is therefore an important vitamin for the body to absorb. Despite its vital role however, vitamin B12 is structurally very sensitive to the hydrochloric acid found in the stomach secretions, and easily denatures in that environment before it has a chance to be absorbed by the small intestine.  Found in fresh animal products (such as liver), vitamin B12 attaches haptocorrin, which has a high affinity for its molecular structure. Coupled together vitamin B12 and haptocorrin create a complex. This haptocorrin–B12 complex is impervious to the insult of the stomach acid, and passes on via the pylorus to the duodenum. In the duodenum pancreatic proteases (a component of pancreatic juice) cleave haptocorrin, releasing vitamin B12 in its free form.

The same cells in the stomach that produce gastric hydrochloric acid, the parietal cells, also produce a molecule called the intrinsic factor (IF), which binds the B12 after its release from haptocorrin by digestion, and without which only 1% of vitamin B12 is absorbed. Intrinsic factor (IF) is a glycoprotein, with a molecular weight of 45 kDa. In the duodenum, the free vitamin B12 attaches to the intrinsic factor (IF) to create a vitamin B12–IF complex. This complex then travels through the small bowel and reaches the terminal tertiary portion of the small intestine, called the ileum. The ileum is the longest of all portions of the small intestine, and has on its surface specialized receptors called cubilin receptors, that identify the B12–IF complexes and take them up into the circulation via endocytosis-mediated absorption.

In short, the essential function of haptocorrin is protection of the acid-sensitive vitamin B12 while it moves through the stomach.
Haptocorrin also circulates and binds approximately 80% of circulating B12, rendering it unavailable for cellular delivery by transcobalamin II.

References

Further reading 

 
 
 
 
 
 
 
 
 
 
 
 
 
 
 
 
 
 
 
 

Digestive system